Žegar is a historical settlement in the mountainous Bukovica region, above the Zrmanja River, not far from the Krupa Monastery. The village itself lied above the Žegar Field, from where the population had long "jumped into" (i.e. guerilla warfare) the Dinara, the Venetian-Ottoman border for centuries. Today, the historical region includes the villages of Kaštel Žegarski, Bogatnik, Komazeci, and Nadvoda, which are all administratively part of the Obrovac Municipality. The inhabitants are predominantly ethnic Serbs.

Notable people
Janko Mitrović (1613–1659), Morlach army leader
Stojan Janković (1636–1687), Morlach army leader
Gerasim Zelić (1752–1828), Serbian Orthodox archimandrite and writer
Vladimir Milić (1955-), retired Serbian shot putter

References

Venetian period in the history of Croatia
Serb communities in Croatia
History of Dalmatia